Duckman: The Graphic Adventures of a Private Dick is a point-and-click adventure video game developed by the Illusions Gaming Company and published by Playmates Interactive based on the American television series, Duckman. In the game, Duckman has been usurped by a similar-looking impersonator, whom the real Duckman must expose.

Gameplay
The gameplay is that of a standard point and click adventure. Duckman can interact with and use collected items on various characters and objects. There are two ways to interact with a person: a normal way and an angry way. Being based on the popular animated sitcom, the game is filled with black humor. The game contains about thirty locations.

Plot
Private detective Duckman becomes a celebrity and is about to star in his own TV show. Now, he lives his life with pleasure, abandoning his family, only to be one day removed and replaced by a new Duckman, a more muscular and superhero-like version. Duckman is about to commit suicide, having been rejected by his family; however, his friend, Cornfed, asks him to return his place under the sun and take down the new Duckman. After a series of humorous adventures, Duckman is able to gain access to the studio where the show is filming. There, he confronts his impersonator, who is revealed to be a robot, and is then destroyed. The game culminates with Duckman opposing the one behind the whole impersonator plot, his arch-enemy King Chicken.

Development
The game's plot and dialogue were scripted over several days in meetings between the development team and the writers for the Duckman television show. The game was developed on the Illusions Gaming Company's usual adventure game engine, though modified to allow the developers to script directly into the program.

Jason Alexander, who voiced Duckman in the television show, turned down the role for the video game. Playing Duckman painfully strained Alexander's voice, and as such he felt the game's script, which included over five times as many lines for his part as he had in a typical episode of the show, would be too much for him. Veteran actor Michael J. Gough provides his voice for Duckman instead. The remainder of the show's cast all reprised their roles for the game.

Whereas the full version was released exclusively for Windows, the demo bundled in the Playmates Interactive sampler CD was produced in DOS format.

References

External links
 

Klasky Csupo video games
1997 video games
Adventure games
Point-and-click adventure games
Detective video games
Duckman
Video games about birds
Video games based on animated television series
Video games developed in the United States
Windows games
Windows-only games
ScummVM-supported games